Joseph Mauclair (Clichy, 9 March 1906 — Créteil, 5 February 1990) was a French professional road bicycle racer from 1927 to 1938, who won the 17th stage in the 1928 Tour de France.  In 1930 traveled to Australia with Jean Bidot to compete in two stage races, the Sydney to Melbourne covering  and the Tour of Tasmania covering .  Mauclair won stage 2 of the Sydney to Melbourne and won the general classification ahead of Hubert Opperman and Bidot.  He won the first stage of the Tour of Tasmanaia and finished 2nd in the general classification behind Opperman with Bidot finishing 3rd.

Major results

1926
1st final of Etoiles de France cyclistes
4th Paris-Reims
1927
3rd Paris-Arras 
1928
Tour de France 
1st stage 17
2nd stage 21
11th General classification
1st criterium des Algions 
2nd Paris-Bourganeuf 
3rd Paris-Caen 
1929
2nd Brussels-Paris  
2nd Circuit du Jura  
10th Tour de Catalogne
1930
Tour de France abandoned stage 9 
Sydney-Melbourne
1st stage 2
1st general classification
Tour of Tasmania 
1st stage 1
2nd stages 2 & 3
2nd general classification
2nd Paris-Nancy 
1931
1st stage 4 Tour d'Allemagne 
27th general classification Tour de France 
1932
Tour de France abandoned stage 5 
1933
Nice-Toulon  
1st stages 1 & 2
1st general classification
1st Paris-Belfort 
3rd Paris-Caen 
1934
3rd stage 3 Paris-Nice 
1935
1st Paris-Sedan 
Tour de France 
3rd stage 12
 19th general classification
1936
1st Paris-Belfort 
1st Paris-Strasbourg 
3rd Circuit du Jura 
1937
1st Paris-Nantes 
1948
9th Paris-Brest-Paris

References

External links 

Official Tour de France results for Joseph Mauclair

French male cyclists
1906 births
1990 deaths
French Tour de France stage winners
Sportspeople from Clichy, Hauts-de-Seine
Cyclists from Île-de-France